Kalyanavarman may refer to one of the following people:

 Kalyanavarman (Varman dynasty), a 5th-century ruler of the kingdom of Kamarupa in India
 The author of the Sārāvalī, a foundational compilation of Indian astrology